John Ellis (22 October 1930 – 27 May 2019) was a British Labour Party politician.

Ellis was educated at Rastrick Grammar School, Brighouse. He was a laboratory technician and was employed in the Meteorological Office. 
He served as a councillor on Easthampstead Rural District Council from 1962.

Ellis contested Wokingham in 1964. He was Member of Parliament for Bristol North West from 1966 to 1970 (when he lost the seat), and then for Brigg and Scunthorpe from 1974 to 1979, when he lost to the Conservative Michael Brown by 486 votes (0.7%). Ivor Crewe, Director of the British Election Study, attributed his defeat to the intervention of a Democratic Labour Party candidate, who polled over 2,000 votes, and thus "splintered  enough of the Labour vote" to allow the Conservatives narrowly win the seat.
  
Ellis was an assistant government whip from 1974 to 1976. He also served as a member of the Commons Expenditure Committee.

He died in Scunthorpe in May 2019 at the age of 88.

References

The Times Guide to the House of Commons, Times Newspapers Ltd, 1966 & 1979

External links 
 

1930 births
2019 deaths
Councillors in Berkshire
Labour Party (UK) MPs for English constituencies
People educated at Rastrick High School
People from Scunthorpe
People from Rastrick
UK MPs 1966–1970
UK MPs 1974
UK MPs 1974–1979